Isaac Cumming is a professional Australian rules footballer playing for the Greater Western Sydney Giants in the Australian Football League (AFL). He plays as a defender and made his debut in round 8, 2018 against the West Coast Eagles at Spotless Stadium.

Originally from Broken Hill, Cumming played junior football for North Broken Hill before joining the Giants Academy. He was drafted with pick 20 in the 2016 AFL draft. He played in the North East Australian Football League (NEAFL) for the Western Sydney University Giants (the GWS Giants' NEAFL affiliate).

In March 2018, Cumming recommitted to GWS until 2020.

References

External links 

 

Living people
1998 births
Australian rules footballers from New South Wales
Greater Western Sydney Giants players